Lada Sport is the Tolyatti-based performance and motorsport company for Lada-branded cars and a wholly owned subsidiary of AvtoVAZ.

History

AvtoVAZ had a minor involvement in motorsport from the 1970s, producing racing cars for various series. In the 1990s, a small company called TMS produced sportier versions of street-legal Lada cars. The Lada Sport company was established in 2011, and the first performance-focused, street-legal Lada car it produced was the 2011/2013 Granta Sport.

AvtoVAZ entered the World Touring Car Championship in the 2009 season by giving official support to the Russian Bears Motorsport team, branded as Lada Sport, and left at the end of the season. The team had already entered the previous season running a non-factory Lada 110. The Lada Sport company competed from 2013 to 2016 with WTCC-spec Grantas and later Vestas.

Models produced
Since its establishment, Lada Sport produced, among others, the following models:

Complete World Touring Car Championship results
(key) (Races in bold indicate pole position) (Races in italics indicate fastest lap)

* 2008 in Yokohama Teams' Trophy

† Driver did not finish the race, but was classified as he completed over 90% of the race distance.

References

External links
Official Lada Sport Page

Russian auto racing teams
World Touring Car Championship teams
AvtoVAZ
Racecar constructors
Official motorsports and performance division of automakers